Liliana Goodman Meregildo, known professionally as Lilly Goodman (born 19 December 1980) is a Dominican singer and songwriter. Considered one of the best and most important voices in Christian music.  Music has been always a part of her family and she is known for singing Christian themed songs in Spanish. She has also received numerous nominations and awards over the years, some of which include the Latin Grammy and Cassandra Awards (currently Soberano).

Life
Goodman was born in Santo Domingo, Dominican Republic in 1980. She's of British Virgin Islands descent. She attended church where she taught at Sunday school and sang. Her singing became known via the radio. She set out to work in pharmacy but she decided to sing publicly when she was 19. Her first success was in 2001 with an album titled Contigo Dios. In 2006 she released an album titled "Survive" which saw one of her songs being sung by Aline Barros in Portuguese. She was declared the best Christian singer in her home country in 2006.

Goodman married David Hegwood in 2007 and set up a production company with her husband. She lives in Dallas, Texas with her two children, and is a worship pastor and artist in residence at Gateway Church in nearby Southlake.

Range and vocal style
Lilly is one of the most prodigious Gospel artists in Latin America. She has a powerful, clear, and impeccable voice. Her voice has great bass and treble. The timbre of voice that it possesses is highly powerful.
 
Bass Notes: C # 3, D3, E3
 
Belts: B4, C5, C # 5, D5, Eb5, E5, F5, G5
 
Head voice and falsetto: A5, Bb5, B5, C6, C # 6

Features on
Red TV (Colombia) - first year featured her singing
El Juicio Final, 2008
Alex Campos for Regreso A Ti (which won the Latin Grammy Award for Best Christian Album (Spanish Language))
LillyGoodman.com

References

1980 births
Living people
People from Santo Domingo
21st-century Dominican Republic women singers
Dominican Republic performers of Christian music
Dominican Republic Protestants
Dominican Republic people of Cocolo descent